Vladimir Šujster (born 26 May 1972) is a retired Croatian handball player.

Career
Šujster started his career in Rudar and later played for the most elite clubs in Croatian handball.

He played for the Croatia men's national handball team at the 1996 Summer Olympics in Atlanta, where Croatia won the gold medal. He also played at the 1998 European Championship in Italy.

In 1997 with Zagreb Šujster got to the finals of the EHF Champions League where they lost to Barcelona.

Honours 
Zagreb
Croatian First A League (1): 1996-97
Croatian Cup (1): 1997

Individual
Franjo Bučar State Award for Sport - 1996
Lifetime achievement award for sports given by the city of Samobor - 2007

References

1972 births
Living people
Croatian male handball players
Olympic handball players of Croatia
Handball players at the 1996 Summer Olympics
Olympic gold medalists for Croatia
Olympic medalists in handball
RK Zamet players
Medalists at the 1996 Summer Olympics